Gerald Joseph Peyton (born 20 May 1956) is a football coach and former footballer who is currently the interim coach of Indian Super League club Odisha FC. A goalkeeper, Peyton had lengthy spells with Fulham and AFC Bournemouth. Following his retirement, he went into coaching and acted as goalkeeping coach for several teams, including Arsenal from 2003 to 2018.

Club career
Born in Birmingham, Peyton's footballing debut came with him featuring for Burnley in July 1976. He thereafter left Turf Moor in October of that year to link up with Fulham. While at the club Peyton was named to the PFA Team of the Year for 1982. He then headed out on loan to Southend United in March where he stayed for another three months. He returned to Craven Cottage in July, ultimately leaving Fulham in the summer of 1986.
 
Peyton made the move to AFC Bournemouth soon afterwards. With the Cherries Peyton won the Third Division title of 1987. He was also named to the PFA Team of the Year for 1987 while at
the club. Peyton as well won Bournemouth's Player of the Year award for 1987.

He eventually moved on to Everton in 1991, from where he was loaned to Bolton Wanderers, Norwich City, Brentford and Chelsea. Peyton returned to Goodison Park in March 1993, eventually being sold to West Ham United in the summer of 1993, where he stayed for a solitary season. He retired from playing soon afterwards. In all, Peyton made over six hundred league appearances.

Peyton then took up the role of goalkeeping coach with Japanese clubs Vissel Kobe and Jubilo Iwata, AIK Solna of Sweden, and, until May 2018, English club Arsenal.

International career
Peyton featured for the Republic of Ireland national football team at the 1988 UEFA European Football Championships and the 1990 FIFA World Cup as an unused substitute . At the World Cup Peyton formed part of the famous Irish squad that got to the quarterfinals of the tournament. Altogether, he won 33 international caps for the Republic of Ireland.

Honours

Club
AFC Bournemouth
Third Division: 1987

Individual
PFA Team of the Year-Third Division: 1982
PFA Team of the Year-Third Division: 1987
AFC Bournemouth Player of the Year: 1987

See also
 List of Republic of Ireland international footballers born outside the Republic of Ireland

References

1956 births
Living people
English footballers
Republic of Ireland association footballers
Republic of Ireland international footballers
Republic of Ireland under-21 international footballers
Republic of Ireland B international footballers
Atherstone Town F.C. players
AFC Bournemouth players
Chelsea F.C. players
West Ham United F.C. players
Everton F.C. players
Bolton Wanderers F.C. players
Burnley F.C. players
Brentford F.C. players
Association football goalkeepers
UEFA Euro 1988 players
1990 FIFA World Cup players
English people of Irish descent
Arsenal F.C. non-playing staff
Premier League players
Footballers from Birmingham, West Midlands
Fulham F.C. players
Fulham F.C. non-playing staff
Expatriate footballers in Japan
Association football goalkeeping coaches
Indian Super League head coaches
Odisha FC head coaches